St. Methodios I or Methodius I, (788/800 – June 14, 847) was Ecumenical Patriarch of Constantinople from March 4, 843 to June 14, 847. He was born in Syracuse and died in Constantinople. His feast day is celebrated on June 14 in both the East and the West.

Life
Born to wealthy parents, Methodios was sent as a young man to Constantinople to continue his education and hopefully attain an appointment at court. But instead he entered a monastery in Bithynia, eventually becoming abbot.

Under Emperor Leo V the Armenian (813–820) the Iconoclast persecution broke out for the second time. In 815 Methodios went to Rome, perhaps as an envoy of the deposed Patriarch Nikephorοs.  Upon his return in 821 he was arrested and exiled as an iconodule by the Iconoclast regime of Emperor Michael II.  Methodios was released in 829 and assumed a position of importance at the court of the even more fervently iconoclast Emperor Theophilos.

Soon after the death of the emperor, in 843, the influential minister Theoktistos convinced the Empress Mother Theodora, as regent for her two-year-old son Michael III, to permit the restoration of icons by arranging that her dead husband would not be condemned.  He then deposed the iconoclast Patriarch John VII Grammatikos and secured the appointment of Methodios as his successor, bringing about the end of the iconoclast controversy.  A week after his appointment and after the Council of Constantinople (843), accompanied by Theodora, Michael, and Theoktistos, Methodios made a triumphal procession from the church of Blachernae to Hagia Sophia on March 11, 843, restoring the icons to the church.  This heralded the restoration of Catholic orthodoxy, and became a holiday in the Byzantine Church, celebrated every year on the First Sunday of Great Lent, and known as the "Triumph of Orthodoxy".

Throughout his short patriarchate, Methodios tried to pursue a moderate line of accommodation with members of the clergy who were formerly Iconoclasts.  This policy was opposed by extremists, primarily the monks of the Stoudios monastery, who demanded that the former Iconoclasts be punished severely as heretics.  To rein in the extremists, Methodios was forced to excommunicate and arrest some of the more persevering monks.

Methodios was indeed well-educated; engaged in both copying and writing of manuscripts. His individual works included polemica, hagiographical and liturgical works, sermons and poetry.

References
The Oxford Dictionary of Byzantium, Oxford University Press, 1991.
 Methodius I article in the Catholic Encyclopedia (1910)
 St Methodius the Patriarch of Constantinople Orthodox Icon and Synaxarion

See also 

 Council of Constantinople (843)
 Theodora (wife of Theophilos)

847 deaths
People from Syracuse, Sicily
Byzantine saints
Byzantine Iconoclasm
Byzantine saints of the Eastern Orthodox Church
Sicilian saints
9th-century patriarchs of Constantinople
9th-century Christian saints
Year of birth unknown